Eunice is a genus in the polychaete family Eunicidae. Their bodies have multiple segments. They have two eyes and five tentacles. They have well-developed sense organs and relatively large brains. Their color is dark purple-brown to red-brown with a white ring at the fourth segment. They are found in oceans and seas around the world. They have an evertible proboscis with distinctive mouthparts, some of which comprise two rows of maxilliary plates in a radula-like fashion.

Species
Eunice afra Peters, 1854
Eunice antennata (Savigny, 1820)
Eunice aphroditois Pallas, 1788, Bobbit Worm
Eunice australis Quatrefagus, 1865
Eunice bilobata Treadwell, 1906
Eunice borneensis (Grube, 1878)
Eunice denticulata
Eunice filamentosa
Eunice fuscafasciata (Treadwell, 1922)
Eunice macrobranchia (Schmarda, 1861)
Eunice norvegica (Linnaeus, 1767) 
Eunice pennata (O.F. Müller, 1776)
Eunice perimensis Gravier, 1901
Eunice perrieri Gravier, 1900
Eunice petersi Fauchald, 1992
Eunice philippinensis Hartmann-Schröder & Zibrowius, 1998
Eunice philocorallia Buchanan, 1893
Eunice plessisi Rullier, 1972
Eunice plicata Baird, 1869
Eunice polybranchia (Verrill, 1880)
Eunice prayensis Kinberg, 1865
Eunice procera Grube, 1866
Eunice profunda Miura, 1987
Eunice tovarae Carrera-Parra & Salazar-Vallejo, 2011
Eunice uschakovi Wu, Sun & Liu, 2013
Eunice vittata (Delle Chiaje, 1828)

References

Davey, Keith. Life on Australian Seashores. "Eunice." Online. March 4, 2008.
Taxonomicon
Bennett, I. (1987) W.J. Dakin's classic study: Australian Seashores. p. 190, Angus & Robertson, Sydney.
Davey, K. (1998) A Photographic Guide to Seashore Life of Australia. p. 37, New Holland, Sydney.
Edgar, G.J. (1997) Australian Marine Life: the plants and animals of temperate waters. p. 159, Reed Books, Kew.
Fishelson, L. & F. Rullier (1969). Quelques Annelides Polychetes de la Mer Rouge. Israel Journal of Zoology 18: 49-117.
Gordon, D. (Ed.) (2009). New Zealand Inventory of Biodiversity. Volume One: Kingdom Animalia. 584 pp.
Phillips, R. Dales. Annelids Pg 110. Hutchison and Company. London. 1963.
 Shepherd, S.A. & Thomas, I.M. (1982) Marine Invertebrates of Victoria, Pt. 1. p. 257, South Australian Government Printer, Adelaide.
 http://www.hia.php?p=taxdetails&id=129278

Polychaete genera
Errantia